Ruined for Ordinary is the second album by contemporary Christian music singer Nate Sallie. Three singles were released from the album: "Breakthrough", "Holy Spirit", and "Lone Ranger". The Inspired Heart Edition of Ruined For Ordinary included a bonus disc with five additional songs and was available exclusively at Family Christian Stores for a limited time. A studio version of one of those additional songs, "Sing Through Me", was included as a bonus track on other editions of the album.

Track listing

References 

2007 albums